There is also an asteroid called 900 Rosalinde.

Rosalind is an inner satellite of Uranus. It was discovered from the images taken by Voyager 2 on 13 January 1986, and was given the temporary designation S/1986 U 4. It was named after the daughter of the banished Duke in William Shakespeare's play As You Like It. It is also designated Uranus XIII.

Rosalind belongs to Portia group of satellites, which also includes Bianca, Cressida, Desdemona, Portia, Juliet, Cupid, Belinda and Perdita. These satellites have similar orbits and photometric properties. Other than its orbit, radius of 36 km and geometric albedo of 0.08 virtually nothing is known about Rosalind.

In the Voyager 2 images Rosalind appears as an almost spherical object. The ratio of axes of Rosalind's prolate spheroid is 0.8-1.0. Its surface is grey in color.

Rosalind is very close to a 3:5 orbital resonance with Cordelia.

See also 

 Moons of Uranus

References 

Explanatory notes

Citations

External links 
 Rosalind Profile by NASA's Solar System Exploration
 Uranus' Known Satellites (by Scott S. Sheppard)

Moons of Uranus
19860113
Moons with a prograde orbit
As You Like It